The Cumberland Gap is a pass in the eastern United States through the long ridge of the Cumberland Mountains, within the Appalachian Mountains and near the tripoint of Kentucky, Virginia, and Tennessee.

Long used by Native American nations, the Cumberland Gap was brought to the attention of settlers in 1750 by Thomas Walker, a Virginia physician and explorer. The path was used by a team of frontiersmen led by Daniel Boone, making it accessible to pioneers who used it to journey into the western frontiers of Kentucky and Tennessee. An important part of the Wilderness Road, it is now part of the Cumberland Gap National Historical Park.

Geography
The Cumberland Gap is one of many passes in the Appalachian Mountains, but the only one in the continuous Cumberland Mountain ridgeline.

The V-shaped gap serves as a gateway to the west.

Centrally located in the eastern United States, the region around Cumberland Gap experiences all four seasons. The summers are typically sunny, warm, and humid with average high temperatures in the mid to upper 80s °F (29-32 °C). In the winter months, January through March, temperatures range in the 30s to 40s °F (0s °C) and are generally mild with rain and few periods of snow.

The nearest cities are Middleboro, Kentucky, and Harrogate, Tennessee. The nearby town of Cumberland Gap in Tennessee is named after the gap.

Geology

The gap was formed by the development of three major structural features: the Pine Mountain Thrust Sheet, the Middlesboro Syncline, and the Rocky Face Fault. Lateral compressive forces of sedimentary rocks from deep layers of the Earth's crust pushing upward 320 to 200 million years ago created the thrust sheet. Resistance on the fault from the opposing Cumberland Mountain to Pine Mountain caused the U-shaped structure of the Middlesboro Syncline. The once flat-lying sedimentary rocks were deformed roughly 40 degrees northwest. Further constriction to the northwest of Cumberland Mountain developed into a fault trending north-to-south called the Rocky Face Fault, which eventually cut through Cumberland Mountain. This combination of natural geological processes created ideal conditions for weathering and erosion of the rocks.

The discovery of the Middlesboro impact structure has proposed new details in the formation of Cumberland Gap. Less than 300 million years ago a meteorite,  "approximately the size of a football field", struck the earth, creating the Middlesboro Crater. One of three astroblemes in the state, it is a  diameter meteorite impact crater with the city of Middlesboro, Kentucky built entirely inside it. Detailed mapping by geologists in the 1960s led many to interpret the geological features of the area to be the site of an ancient impact. In 1966 Robert Dietz discovered shatter cones in nearby sandstone, proving recent speculation. Shatter cones, a rock-shattering pattern naturally formed only during impact events, are found in abundance in the area. The presence of shatter cones found also helped confirm the origin of the impact. In September 2003, the site was designated a Distinguished Geologic Site by the Kentucky Society of Professional Geologists.

Without the Rocky Face Fault, it would have been difficult for pack-horses to navigate this gap and the gap in Pine Mountain near Pineville, and it would be improbable that wagon roads would have been constructed at an early date. Middlesboro is the only place in the world where coal is mined inside an astrobleme. Special mining techniques must be used in the complicated strata of this crater.

History

The earliest written account of Cumberland Gap dates to the 1670s, by Abraham Wood of Virginia. Some time before 1748 Samuel Stalnaker is believed to have passed through the gap while exploring the region.

The gap was named for Prince William, Duke of Cumberland, son of King George II of Great Britain, who had many places named for him in the American colonies after the Battle of Culloden. The explorer Thomas Walker gave the name to the Cumberland River in 1750, and the name soon spread to many other features in the region, such as the Cumberland Gap. In 1769 Joseph Martin built a fort nearby at present-day Rose Hill, Virginia, on behalf of Walker's land claimants. But Martin and his men were chased out of the area by Native Americans, and Martin did not return until 1775.

In 1775 Daniel Boone, hired by the Transylvania Company, arrived in the region leading a company of men to widen the path through the gap to make settlement of Kentucky and Tennessee easier. On his arrival, Boone discovered that Martin had already arrived in Powell Valley, where Martin and his men were clearing land for their own settlement – the westernmost settlement in English colonial America at the time. By the 1790s, the trail that Boone and his men built had been widened to accommodate wagon traffic and became known as the Wilderness Road.

Several American Civil War engagements occurred in and around the Cumberland Gap and are known as the Battle of the Cumberland Gap. In June 1862, Union Army General George W. Morgan captured the gap for the Union. In September of that year, Confederate States Army forces under Edmund Kirby Smith occupied the gap during General Braxton Bragg's Kentucky Invasion. The following year, in a bloodless engagement in September 1863, Union Army troops under General Ambrose Burnside forced the surrender of 2,300 Confederates defending the gap, gaining Union control of the gap for the remainder of the war.

It is estimated that between 200,000 and 300,000 European-American settlers passed through the gap on their way into Kentucky and the Ohio Valley before 1810. Today 18,000 cars pass beneath the site daily, and 1.2 million people visit the park on the site annually. The park features many hiking trails.

U.S. Route 25E passed overland through the gap before the completion of the Cumberland Gap Tunnel in 1996. The original trail was then restored.

Historic district
The gap and associated historic resources were listed on the National Register of Historic Places as a historic district on May 28, 1980.

Biology and ecology

Flora
Within the Cumberland Gap National Historical Park there are currently 855 known species of vascular plants identified, but that number is expected to increase with reports from National Park Service inventory and monitoring programs. There are 15 various vegetation communities throughout the park, with some of them in special locations, such as mountain bogs, low-elevation wetlands, and rocky bluffs.

Fauna
Of the 371 species of animals listed so far within the park, 33 are mammals, 89 are birds, 29 amphibians, 15 reptiles, 27 fish, and 187 are insects, however many others remain to be included. Visitors to the park can expect to see gray squirrels, white-tailed deer, cottontail rabbits, songbirds, hawks, snakes, turtles, and perhaps black bear or bobcat. Over 120 species of birds have been logged in the park on the website eBird.

In popular culture

Music
The gap has been mentioned in many songs and is the title of many, including:
 "Cumberland Gap" (first recorded in 1924) is a popular folk song recorded and performed by American folk and bluegrass musicians such as Woody Guthrie and Earl Scruggs, and by British skiffle artists such as Lonnie Donegan and the Vipers Skiffle Group.
 "Cumberland Gap", by American band Ragged Mountain String Band
 "Cumberland Gap", by Jason Isbell and the 400 Unit
 "Cumberland Gap", by David Rawlings on his 2017 album Poor David's Almanack
 "Wagon Wheel", by Old Crow Medicine Show

See also

 Moccasin Gap
 Pound Gap
 List of mountain passes in the Appalachian Mountains

References

Further reading

 
 Rickie Longfellow, Back in Time: The Cumberland Gap, United States Department of Transportation, Federal Highway Administration

External links

 Cumberland Gap National Historical Park at the National Park Service

 
Landforms of Bell County, Kentucky
Landforms of Claiborne County, Tennessee
Landforms of Lee County, Virginia
Valleys of Kentucky
Valleys of Tennessee
Wind gaps of Virginia
Rail mountain passes of the United States
East Tennessee
Eastern Kentucky Coalfield
Southwest Virginia
Mountain passes of Tennessee
Mountain passes of Virginia
Valleys of Virginia